Musa Wali is located in south of Piplan on Piplan, Kallurkot road.  The population was around 10,000 according to 1998 census.  Major castes living in Musa Wali are Aaheer, Arain (Shahbaz Ahmad Anjam), Awan, and Joyia (local Saraiki speaking). The people are mostly farmers.

Union councils of Mianwali District
Populated places in Mianwali District